Kunjikuruvi ( Ammayude Swantham Kunju Mary )  is a 1992 Indian Malayalam film, directed by Vinayan. The film stars Nedumudi Venu and Geetha in lead roles. The film had musical score by Mohan Sithara.

Cast
Nedumudi Venu
Geetha
Madhu as Father Francis

Soundtrack
Bichu Thirumala wrote all the lyrics.

"Olakayil Tullum" - KJ Yesudas, KS Chithra
"Outer Hedge Moha" - KS Chithra

References

External links
 

1992 films
1990s Malayalam-language films
Films directed by Vinayan
Films scored by Mohan Sithara